James Aryee Addy (9 December 1939 – 26 April 2009) was a Ghanaian sprinter who competed in the 1960 Summer Olympics, in the 1964 Summer Olympics, in the 1968 Summer Olympics, and in the 1972 Summer Olympics.

References

1939 births
2009 deaths
Ghanaian male sprinters
Olympic athletes of Ghana
Athletes (track and field) at the 1960 Summer Olympics
Athletes (track and field) at the 1964 Summer Olympics
Athletes (track and field) at the 1968 Summer Olympics
Athletes (track and field) at the 1972 Summer Olympics
Athletes (track and field) at the 1962 British Empire and Commonwealth Games
Athletes (track and field) at the 1966 British Empire and Commonwealth Games
Athletes (track and field) at the 1970 British Commonwealth Games
Commonwealth Games bronze medallists for Ghana
Commonwealth Games silver medallists for Ghana
Commonwealth Games gold medallists for Ghana
Commonwealth Games medallists in athletics
African Games silver medalists for Ghana
African Games medalists in athletics (track and field)
Athletes (track and field) at the 1965 All-Africa Games
Medallists at the 1962 British Empire and Commonwealth Games
Medallists at the 1966 British Empire and Commonwealth Games